The 2006 Copa de la Reina de Hockey Patines was the inaugural edition of the Spanish women's rink hockey national cup. It took place on 25 and 26 March 2006 in Burgos, and it was won by CP Voltregà, which defeated CE Arenys de Munt in the final.

Quarterfinals

Semifinals

Third place match

Final

References

Copa de la Reina
Copa de la Reina de Hockey Patines
Roller
Copa de la Reina de Hockey Patines